Antichloris affinis is a moth of the family Erebidae. It was described by Walter Rothschild in 1912. It was described from Tefé in the Amazon basin.

References

External links
 

Moths described in 1912
Arctiinae of South America
Euchromiina